Edward "Ed" Lawrence Jaworski (March 11, 1926 – August 20, 2008) was an American water polo player who competed in the 1952 Summer Olympics.

He was born in New York City. He entered Columbia College in 1946 but graduated with a B.S. from the Columbia School of Engineering and Applied Science in 1949.

Jaworski was a member of the American water polo team which finished fourth in the 1952 tournament. He played eight matches.

In 1976, he was inducted into the USA Water Polo Hall of Fame.

References

External links
 

1926 births
2008 deaths
Sportspeople from New York City
American male water polo players
Olympic water polo players of the United States
Water polo players at the 1952 Summer Olympics
American water polo coaches
Columbia College (New York) alumni

Columbia School of Engineering and Applied Science alumni